= Rydell & Quick =

Swedish rock band

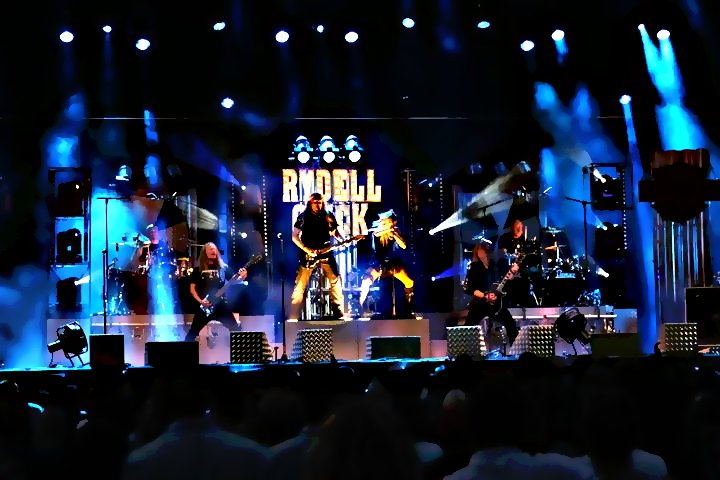
- Rydell & Quick live

Background information
- Origin: Sweden
- Genres: hard rock, blues rock
- Years active: 2005–present
- Labels: RQ Records
- Members: Malin Quick; Christer Rydell; Jonas Bonnier
- Website: www.rydellquick.se

Rydell & Quick is a Swedish rock band featuring male vocalist Christer Rydell and female vocalist and saxophonist Malin Quick. Rydell had formed a band with Peer Stappe, Rydell Rip Offs, playing locally, while Quick performed with big bands. The band was originally formed in 1989 after Quick joined Rydell's band on stage with her instrument. The band has toured extensively around Sweden and since 1999 are sponsored by Harley-Davidson. The band also features two drummers Berndt Baumgartner and Peer Stappe and the bass player Jonas Bonnier. The band has released two albums, R.O.C.K.O.H.O.L.I.C (2006) and R.O.A.D.T.R.I.P.(2012). Their first album was described as " catchy, feel-good, melodic hard rock". Both are from the Västra Götaland area of Sweden and live in Borås.

== Members ==
- Christer Rydell (vocals, guitar)
- Malin Quick (vocals, saxophone)
- Jonas Bonnier (bass)
- Berndt Baumgartner (drums)
- Peer Stappe (drums)

== Discography ==
=== Albums ===
Year	Album	Peak chart positions	Certifications
Year	Album	SWE	Certifications
2006	R.O.C.K.O.H.O.L.I.C	11	
2012	R.O.A.D.T.R.I.P.	3	

=== Singles ===
Year	Single	Peak chart positions	Certifications (sales thresholds)	Album
Year	Single	SWE	Certifications (sales thresholds)	Album
1998	"Stay with Me Baby"	43		
1998	"Reason to Live"	36		
1999	"Nu är det sommar igen"	38		
2001	"Everybody Wants to Be a Star"	33		
